Camilo Alberto Pascual Lus (born January 20, 1934) is a Cuban former Major League Baseball right-handed pitcher. During an 18-year baseball career (1954–71), he played for the original modern Washington Senators franchise (which became the Minnesota Twins in 1961), the second edition of the Washington Senators, Cincinnati Reds, Los Angeles Dodgers, and Cleveland Indians. He was also known by the nicknames "Camile" and "Little Potato."

Pascual's best pitches were his fastball and devastating overhand curveball, described by Ted Williams as the "most feared curveball in the American League for 18 years". His curveball has been rated in the top 10 of all-time. Over his career, he compiled 174 wins, 2,167 strikeouts, and a 3.63 earned run average. He was elected to the American League All-Star team 5 times (from 1959 to 1962, and in 1964). In the second 1961 All-Star Game, he pitched three hitless innings and struck out four. He holds the opening day strikeout record as he fanned 15 in a 10-1 win versus the Boston Red Sox in the 1960 season opener.

Playing career
As a 17-year-old, Pascual left Havana and spent the 1951 season as a minor league free agent pitching for the Class-D Chickasha Chiefs in the Oklahoma Sooner State League and two Class-C teams, the Big Spring Broncs in the Longhorn League and Geneva Robins in the New York Border League. The latter team was made up largely of Cuban players signed by Washington Senator's scout Joe Cambria including future Minnesota Twins teammate Julio Bécquer. Pascual would finish the season with a combined record of 5–4 with a 4.64 ERA and 46 walks in 64 innings. Despite his less than overwhelming stats, the 18-year-old Pascual was signed by the Washington Senators as an amateur free agent prior to the start of the 1952 season. Pascual would spend the 1952 season in Class-B pitching for the Havana Cubans and the Tampa Smokers in the Florida International League, improving to an 8–6 record with a 2.88 ERA and only 66 walks in 122 innings over 24 games. He would be back at Havana for the entire 1953 season and would compile similar stats as the year before (10-6, 3.00 ERA, 68 walks, 141 Inn in 25 games). Following the season, he would play for his hometown Elefantes de Cienfuegos competing for the Caribbean World Series. He would continue to play for Cienfuegos or Tigres de Marianao until Fidel Castro closed the country in 1961.
 
Pascual would go north with the Senators in 1954 and would make his major league debut on April 15, mopping up the last 3 innings of a 6–1 loss to the Boston Red Sox for losing pitcher Bob Porterfield. the 20-year-old Pascual would put in an encouraging rookie season for the 66–88 Senators, finishing 4–7 with a 4.22 ERA, 3 saves and one complete game in 48 appearances (3 starts). However, walks would continue to plague the young pitcher, as he would finish the season with a strikeout-to-walk ratio of less than one (60 strikeouts and 61 walks). Pascaul would continue to be used primarily as a reliever in 1955 and would improve his strikeout ratio, but this would be about the only statistic where he would improve on over his rookie season as he would finish with a 2–12 record and 6.14 ERA – mirroring the club as a whole which won only 53 games. However, Pascual would steadily improve, lowering his ERA and increasing his Win total every year from 1955 to 1959, and he would be named to his first of four consecutive All-Star teams in 1959. Pascual finished 1959 with 17–10 record, a 2.64 ERA, and 185 strikeouts in  innings. He also led the league in both complete games (17) and shutouts (6), while also receiving some support in the MVP balloting.

The period from 1959 to 1964 would see Pascual's peak years. He would win at least 12 games every season while leading the league in complete games, shutouts, and strikeouts three times each and racking up all five of his All-Star games appearances. In 1962 Pascual went 20-11 and led the league in complete games, shutouts and strikeouts to help notch his first 20-win season. In 1963 he had arguably his best season with a 21-9 win lost record, a 2.46 ERA, leading the league in complete games and strikeouts. 1965 would see the Twins/Washington franchise return to the World Series for the first time since Washington lost the 1933 series to the New York Giants. However, after starting the season 8–2, injuries limited Pascual to nine relatively ineffective second-half starts and he lost his World Series matchup with Claude Osteen in Game 3. Pascual would continue to have arm problems in 1966 and would pitch only 103 innings in 21 games, both career lows.

Seeing the writing on the wall, the Twins traded Pascual and once-promising second baseman Bernie Allen on December 3, 1966 to the new Washington Senators for 35-year-old relief pitcher Ron Kline. Although no longer over-powering or the durable innings-eater he had once been, Pascual would have a minor renaissance during the 1967 and 1968 seasons while in Washington winning a total of 25 games while leading the Senator' staff in wins and finishing second in both innings and strikeouts both seasons. However Pascual would get off to a brutal start in 1969 (2-5, 6.83 ERA, 38 walks in  innings) and Washington would sell him to the Cincinnati Reds on July 7, where he gave up seven runs in seven innings over the rest of the year. Unable to make the club in spring training 1970, the Reds released Pascual on April 13 with the Los Angeles Dodgers signing him the same day. He would pitch for the Dodgers until August and for the Cleveland Indians for the first half of the 1971 season, but would only see action in a total of 19 games and he would retire at the end of the season.

Over his career, Pascual led the league in strikeouts in 1961 (221), 1962 (206), and 1963 (202) and as of the start of the 2020 season, he is 68th on the all-time strikeout list. However, he was also in the top 10 in the league in walks and home runs allowed five times in his career and is 87th and 114th all-time in those categories as of the start of the 2020 season. Pascual led the league in complete games three times (1959, 62, 63), and came in second two more times (1961, 64). Pascual was a 20-game winner twice, in 1962–63, and also finished with a career-high in complete games (18) in both of those seasons.

Pascual posted a .205 batting average (198-for-967) with 71 runs, 32 doubles, 5 triples, 5 home runs, 81 RBI and 46 bases on balls. Defensively, he recorded a .973 fielding percentage.

 Pascual is the younger brother of former major league pitcher Carlos Pascual, whose nickname of Potato earned Pascual the nickname of Little Potato.

Retirement
After his playing career ended, Pascual retired to Miami where he had lived since 1960. From 1978 to 1980, Pascual was the Minnesota Twins pitching coach for manager Gene Mauch. Since 1989, he has worked as international scout for the Oakland Athletics, New York Mets, and the Los Angeles Dodgers, for whom he currently scouts Venezuela. Among the major leaguers Pascual has signed are Jose Canseco, Alex Cora, Omar Daal, Miguel Cairo, and Franklin Gutiérrez.

Honors
In 1983, Pascual was elected to the Cuban Baseball Hall of Fame. Then, in 1996 he gained induction into the Caribbean Baseball Hall of Fame as part of their first class. His six victories in the Caribbean Series ties him with José Bracho and Rubén Gómez for the most all-time wins in the tournament.

On May 29, 2010, he was elected in the inaugural class of the Latino Baseball Hall of Fame at the Roman Amphitheater in Altos de Chavón, in the Dominican Republic. He later became the 24th former Twins player inducted into the Twins Hall of Fame, during a ceremony held on July 15, 2012.

He was honored on February 18, 2017, when his name was added to the "Pitching Wall of Great Achievement" at the Ted Williams Museum in St. Petersburg, Florida.

See also
 List of Major League Baseball annual strikeout leaders
 List of Major League Baseball career strikeout leaders

Notes

External links

Baseball Gauge
Venezuelan Professional Baseball League
Bio from Cool of the Evening: The 1965 Minnesota Twins
BIography by Rogério Manzano (Spanish)

1934 births
American League All-Stars
American League strikeout champions
Big Spring Broncs players
Chickasha Chiefs players
Cienfuegos players
Cincinnati Reds players
Cleveland Indians players
Geneva Robins players
Havana Cubans players
Leones del Caracas players
Cuban expatriate baseball players in Venezuela
Living people
Los Angeles Dodgers players
Los Angeles Dodgers scouts
Major League Baseball pitchers
Major League Baseball pitching coaches
Major League Baseball players from Cuba
Cuban expatriate baseball players in the United States
Marianao players
Minnesota Twins coaches
Minnesota Twins players
Oakland Athletics scouts
Tampa Smokers players
Tiburones de La Guaira players
Tigres de Aragua players
Washington Senators (1901–1960) players
Washington Senators (1961–1971) players